Fawzi Bashir Rajab Bait Doorbeen (born 6 May 1984), commonly known as Fawzi Bashir, is an Omani former footballer who last played for Dhofar S.C.S.C. in Oman Professional League.

Club career

He has previously played for various clubs in GCC countries like Ettifaq FC of KSA, Al-Wakrah Sport Club and Al-Gharafa Sports Club of Qatar, Qadsia SC and Kazma Sporting Club of Kuwait and Baniyas SC, Al-Dhafra Club and Ajman Club of UAE. On 1 October 2013, he signed a six-months contract with Dhofar S.C.S.C.

Club career statistics

International career

He has been an active member of the senior national team since the early turn of the millennium.  Fawzi has been a very key player for the Oman national team, as well as his clubs in play making and scoring.  He joined the national team at a very young age of 17 and from the very beginning was a member of the starting line-up. Bashir had held the number 10 shirt since 2001 as well. He was part of the first team squad of the Oman national football team till 2013. Fawzi was selected for the national team for the first time in 2001.

Arabian Gulf Cup
Fawzi has made appearances in the 16th Arabian Gulf Cup, the 17th Arabian Gulf Cup, the 18th Arabian Gulf Cup, the 19th Arabian Gulf Cup, the 20th Arabian Gulf Cup and the 21st Arabian Gulf Cup.

He first showed his talent during the 16th Arabian Gulf Cup in 2003–04, scoring two goals, one in a 1-1 draw against Yemen and another in a 2-0 win over Qatar. In the tournament, Oman finished at the fourth place, hence reaching its best ever position in the Arabian Gulf Cup competition, reaching the final four round for the first time, with eight points from two wins and two draws.

In the 18th Arabian Gulf Cup in 2007, he scored one goal in a 2-1 win over the hosts the United Arab Emirates in the Group stage. This was the second time when Oman reached to the finals but again they lost to the hosts, the United Arab Emirates. Ismail Matar, the Emirati legend, scored the lone goal of the match as United Arab Emirates won their first ever Arabian Gulf Cup.

Finally in 2009, he helped his team to win their first ever Arabian Gulf Cup trophy. He scored one goal in the 19th Arabian Gulf Cup in a 2-0 win over Bahrain.

In the 21st Arabian Gulf Cup in 2013, he made two appearances as the captain of the team but failed to score a single goal. Oman again could score only one goal and this time it was from the spot by youngster Hussain Al-Hadhri against Qatar which Oman eventually lost 2-1. Oman failed to qualify for the semi-finals.

AFC Asian Cup
Fawzi has made appearances in the 2004 AFC Asian Cup qualification, the 2004 AFC Asian Cup, the 2007 AFC Asian Cup qualification, the 2007 AFC Asian Cup, the 2011 AFC Asian Cup qualification and has also represented the national team in the 2015 AFC Asian Cup qualification.

He scored six goals in the 2004 AFC Asian Cup qualification, a brace in a 7-0 win over Nepal, a hat-trick in a 6-0 win over Nepal and another in a 3-1 win over South Korea hence helping his team to qualify for the 2004 AFC Asian Cup. In the tournament, Oman won four points in a 2-0 win over Thailand and a 2-2 draw against Iran and hence failed to qualify for the quarter-finals.

In the 2007 AFC Asian Cup qualification, he scored a brace in a 5-0 win over Pakistan. Badar Al-Maimani scored one and the only goal of Oman in the 2007 AFC Asian Cup in a 1-1 draw against Australia. In the tournament, Oman won two points in two points in a 1-1 draw against Australia and in a 0-0 draw against Iraq and hence failed to qualify for the quarter-finals.

In the 2011 AFC Asian Cup qualification, he scored one goal in a 2-1 win over Indonesia. Oman failed to qualify for the 2011 AFC Asian Cup.

FIFA World Cup qualification
Fawzi has made thirteen appearances in the 2002 FIFA World Cup qualification, six in the 2006 FIFA World Cup qualification, seven in the 2010 FIFA World Cup qualification and eleven in the 2014 FIFA World Cup qualification.

His only goal for Oman in FIFA World Cup qualification matches came in the First Round of 2010 FIFA World Cup qualification in a 2-0 win over Nepal.

Retirement
In February 2013, soon after the 21st Arabian Gulf Cup Bashir announced his retirement from national duty. Basheer and  Oman's coach Paul Le Guen were reported to have started drifting apart nearly a year and a half ago when the Frenchman replaced the midfielder with Ali Al Habsi as captain during the World Cup qualifying match against Australia late in 2011. Media reports suggested fresh differences between the two after a friendly against Togo in late 2012 which Oman lost 0-1.

National Team career statistics

Goals for Senior National Team
Scores and results list Oman's goal tally first.

Honours

Club

With Al-Nasr
Omani League (1): 2003-2004; Runner-up 1998–99, 1999–2000
Sultan Qaboos Cup (2): 2000, 2002; Runner-up 1999, 2001
Omani Super Cup (0): Runner-up 2002

With Al-Qadisiya
Kuwait Crown Prince Cup (1): 2006
Kuwait Emir Cup (1): 2007; Runner-up 2006

With Al-Gharrafa
Qatar Stars League (1): 2007–2008
Sheikh Jassem Cup (1): 2007
Qatar Crown Prince Cup (0): Runner-up 2007

With Bani Yas
UAE President's Cup (0): Runner-up 2011–12

With Ajman
Etisalat Emirates Cup (1): 2012–13

National Team
Arabian Gulf Cup:
Winners: 2009
Runner-up: 2004, 2007

See also
List of men's footballers with 100 or more international caps

References

External links
 
 
 Fawzi Bashir  at Goal.com
 
 
 

1984 births
Living people
People from Salalah
Omani footballers
Oman international footballers
Omani expatriate footballers
Association football midfielders
2004 AFC Asian Cup players
2007 AFC Asian Cup players
FIFA Century Club
Al-Nasr SC (Salalah) players
Ettifaq FC players
Al-Wakrah SC players
Al-Gharafa SC players
Kazma SC players
Baniyas Club players
Al Dhafra FC players
Ajman Club players
Dhofar Club players
Saudi Professional League players
Qatar Stars League players
Oman Professional League players
Expatriate footballers in Saudi Arabia
Omani expatriate sportspeople in Saudi Arabia
Expatriate footballers in Qatar
Omani expatriate sportspeople in Qatar
Expatriate footballers in Kuwait
Omani expatriate sportspeople in Kuwait
Expatriate footballers in the United Arab Emirates
Omani expatriate sportspeople in the United Arab Emirates
Footballers at the 2002 Asian Games
Footballers at the 2006 Asian Games
UAE Pro League players
Asian Games competitors for Oman